Go Hard or Go Home is the sixth album released by rapper, Fiend. It was released on August 31, 2004 for his label Fiend Entertainment and was produced by him and his former No Limit labelmates, Beats By the Pound. Go Hard or Go Home peaked at No. 81 on the Billboard Top R&B/Hip-Hop Albums chart.

Track listing
"Intro" – 0:19  
"Baller 4 Real" – 4:13  
"Two Mad M.F.'s" – 0:14  
"U Can Get It" – 3:51 (feat. C-Loc & Ms. Peaches) 
"Rollin w/Fe" – 3:36  
"Get Bucked" – 4:00  
"Smoking Intro" – 0:38  
"Roll That, Light That" – 4:42 (feat. Jdawg) 
"I'm Ya Problem" – 5:07 (feat. Jdawg) 
"Around My Way" – 4:08  
"Bout That Action" – 4:03 (feat. Hound) 
"Let's Go" – 2:35 (feat. Jdawg) 
"Already" – 2:51 (feat. Pee Wee) 
"Cream Skit" – 0:50  
"I'm Doing It" – 4:02  
"Grab That" – 4:10 (feat. Young Hoggs) 
"Never Been" – 3:49 (feat. Skull Duggery & Jdawg) 
"Guns Up Fiend" – 3:08

References

2004 albums
Fiend (rapper) albums